The W.A. Edwards House is a historic house on Main Street in Evening Shade, Arkansas.  It is a -story wood-frame structure with a dormered side-gable roof, and a front-facing cross gable with decorative shingling.  A single-story porch extends across much of the front and one side, supported by a sandstone foundation and turned posts.  Built c. 1890, by a prominent local merchant, it is one of the community's few 19th century buildings.

The house was listed on the National Register of Historic Places in 1982.

See also
National Register of Historic Places listings in Sharp County, Arkansas

References

Houses on the National Register of Historic Places in Arkansas
Houses completed in 1890
Houses in Sharp County, Arkansas
National Register of Historic Places in Sharp County, Arkansas